The Ledava (German: Limbach, Hungarian: Lendva) is a river of Styria, Austria and of , Prekmurje, northeastern Slovenia.

The Ledava is the largest river of Goričko and the largest tributary of the Mur in Slovenia. It enters Slovenia near , the highest peak of Prekmurje, and flows south as the Ledava. In this part of its course it forms the only gorge in Goričko. The Ledava is the only outflow from the lake. In its lower course the river flows through Murska Sobota and Lendava. It has several (mainly left) tributaries in this part, the largest of them being the Kerka and the longest Kobilje Creek. Finally, it joins the Mur next to the Croatian-Hungarian-Slovenian border near Muraszemenye.

References

External links
 Condition of Ledava - graphs, in the following order, of water level, flow and temperature data for the past 30 days (taken in Čentiba by ARSO)

International rivers of Europe
Rivers of Styria
Rivers of Prekmurje
Hungary–Slovenia border
Rivers of Austria
Border rivers